Mijaks are an ethnographic group of Macedonians who live in the  region which is also known as Mijačija, along the Radika river, in western North Macedonia, numbering 30,000-60,000 people. The Mijaks practise predominantly animal husbandry, and are known for their ecclesiastical architecture, woodworking, iconography, and other rich traditions, as well as their characteristic Galičnik dialect of Macedonian. The main settlement of the Mijaks is Galičnik.

Settlements

The Mijaks have traditionally occupied the Mala Reka region along with the Torbeš, Macedonian-speaking Muslims and another sub-group of Macedonians. The area including the Bistra mountain and Radika region has been termed Mijačija. To the east is the ethnographic region of the Brsjaks.

The Mijaks traditionally inhabited the villages of Galičnik, Lazaropole, Tresonče, Selce, Rosoki, Sušica, Gari and Osoj, while they also inhabited villages by the Radika, around the monastery of Jovan Bigorski, where there are scarce predominantly Christian-inhabited villages, such as Bituše, Gorno Kosovrasti, Gorno Melničani, while the rest has mixed Christian-Muslim population, such as Trebište, Rostuša, and others, the Mijaks are also still inhabiting the part of the region known as Lower Drimkol i.e the villages of Jablanica, Nerezi, Piskupština and Modrič.

However, the majority of Mijak villages are uninhabited as the majority of the inhabitants left during the 20th century. Many villages in Mijačija are now uninhabited due to population shift towards the cities. Large Mijak concentrations can still be found in certain villages around Debar and Bitola. The villages Oreše, Papradište and Melnica in the Veles region were populated by Mijaci during Ottoman rule in Macedonia. The village of Smilevo, in the Bitola region, is also considered to be a Mijak village, in regards to its architecture and history. The north-western quarter of Kruševo was populated by Mijaks.

History

Middle Ages–18th century
Their ethnonym is unclear.  There is a theory that the Mijaks were the first to permanently settle this area; they found mostly Vlachs, who seem to have not been permanently settled; the Mijaks pushed the Vlachs out of the pasture lands, some of whom they assimilated. According to another theory the Mijaks are the remains of an old Slavic tribe that inhabited the area of the Salonica field and was engaged mostly in the cattle breeding. This theory is also confirmed by the legends for the founding of the one of the most significant Mijak settlements as Galičnik.

The Brsjaks and Mijaks did not live geographically scattered prior to the Ottoman conquest.

A proportion of Mijaks converted to Islam during the 16th and 17th centuries, and they are known by the name Torbeši.

In the 18th century, the Mijaks had an armed conflict with the Islamized population regarding pasture lands.

19th century
The Islamized population of Galicnik was re-Christianized in 1843.

Georgi Pulevski was born in 1817. He published a three-language dictionary promoting the Macedonian language and nation as a separate and different from the neighbors.

In 1822, an unpublished lexicographical work by Panajot Ginovski, "Mijački rečnik po našem govoru", was written, containing 20,000 words.

In the summer of 1875, referendum was held on the church affiliation of the Christians in Debar county (kaza). The majority supported the accession to the Bulgarian Exarchate. Only 2 villages and 20 houses in Debar supported the Patriarchate of Constantinople, perceived by local Bulgarians as Greek church.

This was made after the Principality of Bulgaria received most of the Macedonia region by the Ottoman Empire, and the earlier establishment and expansion of the Bulgarian Exarchate (February 28, 1870; in 1874, Skopje and Ohrid voted in favour of the Exarchate).

20th century
During the Ilinden uprising in Kruševo (August 2–3, 1903), a known Mijak involved was Veljo Pecan. During the guerilla period, the Mijaks were divided into those that identified with Serbia and those that did with Bulgaria; one Serbian vojvoda was Doksim Mihailović from Galičnik, while the Bulgarian vojvods were under Maksim N. Bogoja. Tale Krastev, Ivan Pendarovski, Rade Yankulovski, Kiro Simonovski, Yanaki Tomov, Apostol Frachkovski etc. One of the leaders and founders of IMARO, Damyan Gruev with a Bulgarian self-determination is also a Mijak (from Smilevo).

Culture
 
The Mijaks are well known for the extent to which old customs are preserved in their everyday life. The pečalba (seasonal work) was a deeply entrenched tradition of the Mijaks; males in their 20s would often leave the village for months, or even years, at a time, in order to work in more prosperous regions and create wealth for the family — this has contributed to the dispersion of Mijak families, with villages now deserted or sparsely populated.

Mijaks had mastered the craft of woodcarving, and for many years a wood carving school operated in the Mala Reka region. They were responsible for the intricate wood carving which is found inside the Saint Jovan Bigorski Monastery, which is considered to be the best in North Macedonia.

The Galičnik Wedding Festival (Галичка свадба) is the name of a traditional wedding and its characteristic ceremony, which is annually held on Petrovden (St. Peter feast day, 12 July), in which a couple is chosen to receive the wedding and be shown on national television. The Teškoto oro (lit. "the hard one"), a shepherd folk dance of the Mijaks, is one of the national dances of North Macedonia.

Some Mijaks believe that Skanderbeg, the Albanian military commander and national hero, hailed from Mijačija.

Architecture
Mijak architecture has become a defining factor in the culture of the Mijaks. The Mijaks were among the most skilled masons and they helped wealthy Aromanians develop Kruševo into a large, prosperous and beautiful city in the 18th century. Apart from some masons from the Kriva Palanka region, they were the most proficient in all Macedonia and the Balkans. The Saint Jovan Bigorski Monastery is built in the Mijak style.

Language

The Mijaks traditionally speak the Galičnik dialect and Reka dialect. Typical characteristics of the "Mijački govor", Mijak speech, include:

Their speech include peculiarities (in relation to standard Macedonian), such as ovde, onde, kode, koga, zašto, dojdi, etc.

Ethnography 
Mijaks have been subject to ethnographic studies by Macedonian, Bulgarian and Serbian scholars. According to the 2002 census, in the Municipality of Mavrovo and Rostuša there were 4,349 Macedonians (50.46%), 2,680 Turks (31,10%), 1,483 Albanians (17.21%), and smaller numbers of Bosniaks (0.36%), Roma (0.12%), Serbs (0.07%) and others (0.68%); In the Municipality of Debar there were a total of 19,542 inhabitants, of which 11,348 Albanians, 3,911 Macedonians, 2,684 Turks, 1,080 Roma, 22 Serbs, 3 Bosniaks, 2 Vlachs and 492 others.

In their works from the beginning of the 20th century, Bulgarian ethnographers Vasil Kanchov and Dimitar Michev describe the local Mijak population as Bulgarian. The researcher Georgi Traychev from Prilep also describes the Mijaks as part of the Bulgarian people, different from the other, neighboring ethnographic Bulgarian groups as the Brsjaks.

Genetic Studies 
Zupan et al. (2020) examined samples from 44 Mijak males from Galičnik. In terms of Y-dna, Mijaks are located under haplogroups R1a-M458 (56.8%) and R1b-U106 (25%). Other haplogroups include G2a-P15 (11.4%) and E-M215 (4.5%). The high percentage of R1a-M458 among Mijaks associates them more closely with west Slavic groups who have a high frequency of R1a-M458, in particular Poles.

Anthropology

Families

Kargovci
Kauriovci 
Babalijovci 
Boškovci
Guržovski
Gugulevci
Gulovci
Kuculovci
Kutrevci 
Tortevci
Tulevci
Kačevci
Damkovci, 
Čalčevci 
Čaparovci
Čudulovci
Cergovci
Cincarevci
Žantevci
Pulevci ( Pulevski), 
Ramnina and Stepanci, 
Popovci
Frčkovci 
Alautovci
Kolovci
Kostovci
Kokosovci

Notable people
Dimitrija Čupovski  (1878–1940) textbook writer and lexicographer
Ljubomir Frčkoski   (born 12 December 1957, Skopje) politician, family from Galičnik
Dame Gruev (1871–1906),  revolutionary, one of the founders of the IMRO, born in Smilevo
Golub Janić (1853–1918),  politician, born in Mavrovo, family from Lazaropole
Lazar Ličenoski (1901-1964) Macedonian painter, born in Galičnik
Isaija Mažovski (1852-1926), painter and writer, born in Lazaropole
Doksim Mihailović (1883–1912),  Chetnik, born in Galičnik
Josif Mihajlović Jurukovski (1887–1941), mayor of Skopje, born in Tresonče
Georgi Pulevski (1817–1895),  writer and revolutionary, born in Galičnik
Aleksandar Sarievski (1922–2002), traditional singer, born in Galičnik
Toma Smiljanić-Bradina (1888–1969), ethnographer, philologist, dramatist and publicist, born in Tresonče
Damjan Stojanovski (born 1987, Skopje)  basketball player, family from Rosoki
Vojdan Stojanovski (born 1987, Skopje)  basketball player, family from Rosoki
Dičo Zograf (1819-1872), Icon painter, born in Tresonče
Parteniy Zografski (1818–1876), cleric, born in Galičnik

References

Sources
Books

Journal

Ethnic groups in Macedonia (region)
Slavic ethnic groups
Mavrovo and Rostuša Municipality